Pseudopostega crassifurcata is a moth of the family Opostegidae. It was described by Donald R. Davis and Jonas R. Stonis, 2007. It is known from the Sierra Maestra of south-eastern Cuba.

The length of the forewings is about 2.5 mm. Adults have been recorded in July.

Etymology
The species name is derived from the Latin crassus (meaning thick, fat, stout) and furcatus (meaning forked) in reference to the unusually stout form of the furcate apex of the male gnathos.

References

Opostegidae
Moths of Cuba
Endemic fauna of Cuba
Moths described in 2007